Luka Prpa (born July 27, 1998) is an American soccer player who currently plays for MLS Next Pro side Chicago Fire II.

Career

Youth and college 
Prpa played four years of college soccer at Marquette University between 2016 and 2019, making 66 appearances, scoring 18 goals and tallying 21 assists.

While at college, Prpa appeared for USL PDL sides OKC Energy U23 and Chicago FC United.

Professional 
On January 9, 2020, Prpa was selected 34th overall in the 2020 MLS SuperDraft by Houston Dynamo.

On February 27, 2020, Prpa signed for Houston's USL Championship affiliate side Rio Grande Valley FC. He made his professional debut on March 8, 2020, starting in a 1–5 loss to LA Galaxy II, scoring RGVFC's lone goal. Following their 2020 season, Rio Grande Valley opted to decline their contract option on Prpa.

Prpa moved to USL Championship side Hartford Athletic on February 15, 2021.

Personal
Prpa is the cousin of fellow professional soccer player Andrija Novakovich.

References

External links 

 Luka Prpa - Men's Soccer Marquette bio
 
 

1998 births
Living people
American soccer players
Association football midfielders
Chicago FC United players
Hartford Athletic players
Houston Dynamo FC draft picks
Marquette Golden Eagles men's soccer players
Rio Grande Valley FC Toros players
Soccer players from Milwaukee
MLS Next Pro players
USL Championship players
USL League Two players